Colliford Lake is a reservoir on Bodmin Moor, Cornwall, England, United Kingdom. Dozmary Pool outfalls into the lake and the lake's own outfall forms one of the tributaries of the River Fowey.

Leisure facilities on the site include angling and a  adventure and nature park, Colliford Lake Park, which features trails and footpaths, play areas, wetlands, picnic areas and a cafe.

Colliford Lake is managed by the South West Lakes Trust, an environmental and recreational charity which manages fifty inland water sites in Cornwall, Devon, and Somerset.

See also

 List of reservoirs and dams in the United Kingdom

References

Bodmin Moor
Drinking water reservoirs in England
Reservoirs in Cornwall